Frank Tule Tabacchi (October 4, 1910 - October 26, 1983) was a professional baseball umpire who worked in the American League from 1956 to 1959. Tabacchi umpired 515 major league games in his four-year career.

Career
Tabacchi began umpiring minor league baseball in 1946. By 1949, he was in the International League. He was promoted to the major leagues in 1956.

In June 1959, Tabacchi faced a midseason demotion to the minor leagues. Media sources reported that Tabacchi's reassignment would be part of a major shakeup designed by league president Joe Cronin to ensure the quality of American League umpiring.

References

1910 births
1983 deaths
Major League Baseball umpires
Sportspeople from Hudson County, New Jersey